Noah Christopher Chilvers (born 22 February 2001) is an English professional footballer who plays as an attacking midfielder for League Two club Colchester United.

Chilvers joined Colchester United's Academy at under-9 level from Chelmsford City. He made his professional debut for Colchester in March 2019. He then joined National League South side Bath City on loan in October 2019.

Career
Born in Chelmsford, Chilvers played for hometown club Chelmsford City until under-9 level, where he signed for Colchester United. He attended Southend High School for Boys. He signed on as a scholar with Colchester in July 2017.

Chilvers was captain of the under-18 side during the 2018–19 season and became a regular in the under-23 side. He was called up to the first-team squad for the first time in November 2018 for the FA Cup first round tie at Accrington Stanley and was handed squad number 27.

On 9 March 2019, Chilvers made his professional debut from the bench during Colchester's 3–0 home win against Newport County. He replaced Sammie Szmodics after 89-minutes.

On 21 May 2019, Chilvers signed a contract extension with the club.

On 18 October 2019, Chilvers signed a one-month loan deal with National League South side Bath City. He made his debut on 19 October in Bath's 1–0 win at St Albans City. He scored his first goal for the club on 2 November in a 3–1 win at Dulwich Hamlet.

Chilvers scored his first professional goal for Colchester on 26 September 2020 during their 1–1 draw at Barrow. He then signed a new three-year contract on 5 October to keep him with the club until summer 2023.

On the back of his breakthrough season, where he scored three goals and made 49 first-team appearances, Chilvers was named both Colchester United Player of the Year and Young Player of the Year as well as receiving the Goal of the Season award at the end of the 2020–21 campaign.

Career statistics

Honours
Individual
Colchester United Player of the Year: 2020–21

References

2001 births
Living people
Sportspeople from Chelmsford
Association football midfielders
Chelmsford City F.C. players
Colchester United F.C. players
Bath City F.C. players
English Football League players
National League (English football) players
English footballers